Powerlifting at the 1996 Summer Paralympics consisted of ten men's events.

Medal table

Participating nations

Medal summary

See also
Weightlifting at the 1996 Summer Olympics

References 

 

 
1996 Summer Paralympics events
Paralympics